Philton Williams (born 21 June 1994) is a Trinidadian cricketer who plays for the Trinidad and Tobago national team in West Indian domestic cricket. A right-arm fast bowler, he made his List A debut for the team in January 2016, against Jamaica in the 2015–16 Regional Super50.

References

External links
Player profile and statistics at ESPNcricinfo

1994 births
Living people
Trinidad and Tobago cricketers
Trinidad and Tobago representative cricketers
People from Laventille